The State University of New York Polytechnic Institute (SUNY Polytechnic Institute or SUNY Poly) is a public university with campuses in Marcy and Albany, New York. It is part of the State University of New York (SUNY) system.  Founded in 1966 using classrooms at a primary school, what became SUNY Poly is New York's public polytechnic college. The Marcy campus, formerly the SUNY Institute of Technology, has a Utica, New York mailing address and was established in 1987. The Albany campus was formerly a component of the University at Albany, and was established in January 2003.

SUNY Poly is accredited by the Middle States Commission on Higher Education. The university offers over 25 bachelor's degrees, 18 graduate level degrees, and five doctoral degrees within five different colleges. SUNY Poly students come from across the state of New York, throughout the United States, and more than twenty other nations, with more than 25,000 alumni.

History
Originally a graduate and upper-division (transfer) institution, SUNY Poly offered classes in temporary locations throughout Utica and at extension sites for several years until the first buildings were constructed on the permanent Marcy campus in the 1980s. In 2002, the SUNY Board of Trustees approved a mission change, enabling SUNY Poly to offer upper-division programs in professional, technological, and applied studies. In 2003, SUNY Poly admitted its first class of freshmen, becoming a four-year institution. This class graduated in May 2007.

The university's name derives from the 2014 merger of the SUNY Institute of Technology and the College of Nanoscale Science and Engineering, formerly a component of the University at Albany. This merger created five colleges within the institute, including the College of Arts & Sciences, the College of Engineering, the College of Health Sciences, the College of Business Management, and the College of Nanoscale Science and Engineering.

Currently, the university offers programs in the disciplines of engineering, engineering technology, and other programs and degrees in business administration, technology, nursing, design, professional studies, and the arts and sciences at its Utica campus, and nanoscale science, nanoscale engineering, as well as nanobioscience programs at its Albany campus.

Campuses

Marcy
The Marcy campus occupies more than 400 acres, with major buildings, including four residential complexes, surrounded by trees and green landscape. The "west campus" property of more than 300 acres is reserved for the development of the Marcy NanoCenter. Construction and renovation projects totaling $100 million in recent years included a new student center, field house, and residence hall complex—all completed in 2011.

There are two academic halls on campus:  William R. Kunsela Hall and James H. Donovan Hall.

Opened in March 2003, the Peter J. Cayan Library is on the southern portion of the campus.

Albany

Notable people who have visited SUNY Poly's Albany campus include President Barack Obama and Apple Inc. co-founder Steve Wozniak.

Academics 
SUNY Poly is organized into five colleges:
 College of Arts & Sciences
 College of Business Management
 College of Engineering
 College of Health Sciences 
 College of Nanoscale Science and Engineering

Research

Semiconductors and microchips
SUNY Poly's Albany campus is also the site of a pilot scale semiconductor research and development center in Albany, NY. In addition to nanoscale science and engineering research, development, and commercialization efforts at the Albany campus, there are wide-ranging research efforts by faculty, staff, and students at the institution's Utica campus, including in the areas of:
Maintenance
Additive manufacturing
Quantum computing
Artificial intelligence
Anthropology
Redox biology
Yawning and brain cooling
Sports, games, and athletics in evolutionary perspective
Cloud computing
Cybernetics
Design exposure and entrepreneurship
Robotics

Cleanrooms 
Currently, a US$250–300 million semiconductor manufacturing research facility known as the Computer Chip Commercialization Center or "Quad-C" is located on the Marcy campus. The research facility leases space to Danfoss Power Solutions in the building.

Student life and governance

Residence halls
Four residence halls are on the Marcy campus, including the oldest, Adirondack Residence Hall, Mohawk Residence Hall, constructed in the late-1990s and located on the northern portion of campus, Oriskany Residence Hall, completed in 2011, and Hilltop residence Hall, completed in 2020. In 2019, SUNY Poly broke ground on its next residence hall, opened in the fall 2020 semester. The  residence  hall  is designed to  be  “zero-net,  carbon  certified,” exceeding existing energy codes with the infrastructure to add future on-site renewable energy  production  systems. Once these systems are installed, the building will use equal to or less than the energy annually it  can  produce  on-site  through  renewable  resources.

Students attending the Albany campus gain a comprehensive residential and dining experience, health, wellness, and counseling services, as well as additional recreational opportunities as a result of a partnership with the University at Albany. All residential students are housed at the University at Albany Freedom Apartments adjacent to the SUNY Poly campus.

Athletics
SUNY Poly is a member of the National Collegiate Athletic Association (NCAA) Division III and the United East Conference (formerly known as the North Eastern Athletic Conference, or NEAC). The current roster of SUNY Poly varsity sports includes baseball, softball, and men's and women's basketball, cross country, lacrosse, soccer, and volleyball. SUNY Poly's athletic nickname is the Wildcats.

The Wildcat Field House, completed in 2011, features a state-of-the-art fitness center, two full-sized basketball courts and four volleyball courts, indoor practice facilities for all Wildcat teams, a running track, an expansive training room, team rooms, and offices for the athletics department's administrative staff and coaches. A new multi-sport turf field, new baseball field, and an updated softball field were also constructed as part of the Wildcat Field House project. The SUNY Poly basketball teams play their home contests in the Campus Center Gym. The "CC" was completed in the early 1980s as the original home for Wildcat Athletics. Upon the completion of the Wildcat Field House, the Campus Center was retrofitted to be used solely for basketball. The most recent update to the gym was in 2016 when the scoreboard was updated and the floor and paint were refinished to match the current team identity.
In 2020-21 the Wildcats will change conferences, transitioning from the North Eastern Athletic Conference (NEAC) into the North Atlantic Conference (NAC).

References

External links
 

 
Universities and colleges in Oneida County, New York
Universities and colleges in Albany County, New York
Education in Capital District (New York)
1966 establishments in New York (state)
Educational institutions established in 1966
Science and technology in New York (state)
Engineering universities and colleges in New York (state)
Utica–Rome metropolitan area
Polytechnical
Public universities and colleges in New York (state)